The All-Ireland Senior Hurling Championship 1913 was the 27th series of the All-Ireland Senior Hurling Championship, Ireland's premier hurling knock-out competition.  Kilkenny won the championship, beating Tipperary 2-4 to 1-2 in the final.

Format

All-Ireland Championship

Quarter-final: (1 match) This was a lone match between the Leinster champions and Glasgow.  One team was eliminated at this stage while the winning team advanced to the semi-finals.

Semi-finals: (2 matches) The winning team from the lone quarter-final join Lancashire and the Connacht and Munster representatives to make up the semi-final pairings.  Two teams are eliminated at this stage while the two winning teams advance to the All-Ireland final.

Final: (1 match) The winners of the two semi-finals contest this game with the winners being declared All-Ireland champions.

Results

Connacht Senior Hurling Championship

Leinster Senior Hurling Championship

Munster Senior Hurling Championship

All-Ireland Senior Hurling Championship

Championship statistics

Miscellaneous

 For the first time since the 1899 championship there are no representatives from the Ulster championship.
 Roscommon win the Connacht championship for the first and only time in their history.
 Kilkenny win their first three-in-a-row of All-Ireland titles.

References

Sources

 Corry, Eoghan, The GAA Book of Lists (Hodder Headline Ireland, 2005).
 Donegan, Des, The Complete Handbook of Gaelic Games (DBA Publications Limited, 2005).

1913
All-Ireland Senior Hurling Championship